Rachel White may refer to

 Rachel White (actress) (born 1978), US-Indian actress
 Rachel White (dancer), professional dancer from Tbilisi
 Rachel White (volleyball) (born 1974), British-born Australian volleyball player